Eupithecia bellimargo is a moth in the  family Geometridae. It is found in Argentina.

References

Moths described in 1907
bellimargo
Moths of South America